Axtell High School is a public high school in Axtell, Nebraska.

References

External links

Public high schools in Nebraska
Schools in Kearney County, Nebraska